Copernicus is a 1973 Polish historical film directed by Ewa Petelska and Czesław Petelski. The film was entered into the 8th Moscow International Film Festival where it won the Silver Prize. It was also selected as the Polish entry for the Best Foreign Language Film at the 46th Academy Awards, but was not accepted as a nominee.

Cast
 Andrzej Kopiczyński as Mikołaj Kopernik
 Barbara Wrzesińska as Anna Schilling – cousin
 Czesław Wołłejko as Lukasz Watzenrode – bishop of Warmia
 Andrzej Antkowiak as Andrzej Kopernik
 Klaus-Peter Thiele as Georg Joachim von Lauchen gen. Rhetikus
 Henryk Boukołowski as Cardinal Hipolit d'Este
 Hannjo Hasse as Andreas Osiander – editor
 Henryk Borowski as Tiedemann Giese – bishop of Chełmno
 Jadwiga Chojnacka as Thief Kacper's mother
 Aleksander Fogiel as Matz Schilling – Anna's father
 Emilia Krakowska as Kacper's wife
 Gustaw Lutkiewicz as Jan Dantyszek – bishop of Warmia
 Leszek Herdegen as Mönch Mattheusz
 Witold Pyrkosz as Prepozyt Płotowski
 Wiktor Sadecki as Wojciech z Brudzewa

See also
 List of submissions to the 46th Academy Awards for Best Foreign Language Film
 List of Polish submissions for the Academy Award for Best Foreign Language Film

References

External links
 

1973 films
1970s biographical films
1970s historical films
Biographical films about scientists
Biographical films about mathematicians
Polish biographical films
Polish historical films
1970s Polish-language films
Films directed by Ewa Petelska
Films directed by Czesław Petelski
Films set in the 16th century
Cultural depictions of Nicolaus Copernicus